Sarah Hargreaves (born 17 May 1989, Fårevejle, Sjaelland) is a British handball goalkeeper. She has played for the British national team, qualifying thanks to her British father, and competed at the 2012 Summer Olympics in London. At the time of her participation in the 2012 Olympics, her club is Slagelse FH. She was one of only two players in the squad, along with Kelsi Fairbrother, to remain with her club team instead of joining the British programme in Crystal Palace.

References

External links

British female handball players
1989 births
Living people
Handball players at the 2012 Summer Olympics
Olympic handball players of Great Britain